Theodore Holtop Turner (May 4, 1892 – February 4, 1958), was a Major League Baseball pitcher who appeared in one game in  with the Chicago Cubs. He batted and threw right-handed. Turner had a 0–0 record, with a 13.50 ERA.

He was born in Lawrenceburg, Kentucky, and died in Lexington.

References

External links

1892 births
1958 deaths
Major League Baseball pitchers
Baseball players from Kentucky
Chicago Cubs players
People from Lawrenceburg, Kentucky